Alfredo Peñaloza Carmona (born 31 March 1947 in Mexico City) is a Mexican former long-distance runner who competed in the 1968 Summer Olympics and in the 1972 Summer Olympics. He was third in the 1967 Pan American Games marathon.

References

1947 births
Living people
Mexican male long-distance runners
Athletes from Mexico City
Olympic athletes of Mexico
Athletes (track and field) at the 1968 Summer Olympics
Athletes (track and field) at the 1972 Summer Olympics
Pan American Games bronze medalists for Mexico
Athletes (track and field) at the 1967 Pan American Games
Pan American Games medalists in athletics (track and field)
Central American and Caribbean Games gold medalists for Mexico
Competitors at the 1970 Central American and Caribbean Games
Central American and Caribbean Games medalists in athletics
Medalists at the 1967 Pan American Games
20th-century Mexican people